Robert G. Evans, OC, FRSC is a Canadian economist. He is currently Emeritus Professor at the Vancouver School of Economics at the University of British Columbia.

He was the recipient of the William B. Graham Prize for Health Services Research in 2001 and was appointed an Officer of the Order of Canada in 2004.

References

Fellows of the Royal Society of Canada
Canadian economists
Year of birth missing (living people)
Living people
Officers of the Order of Canada